Walter Andrae (February 18, 1875 – July 28, 1956) was a German archaeologist and architect born near Leipzig. He was part of the mission that stole the Ishtar Gate out of Iraq in the 1910s.

Career

Archaeologist
He initially studied architecture, and in 1898 participated in an archaeological dig at Babylon under the leadership of Robert Koldewey (1855–1925), where he played an influential role in the smuggling of the Ishtar Gate out of the country. From 1903 to 1914, he directed the excavation of the ancient Assyrian capital of Assur. During this time period, he also performed archaeological excavations at Hatra and Shuruppak. Another significant archaeological site that he was involved in was the Hittite city of Sam'al.

Museum curator and director
In 1921 Andrae became curator of the Vorderasiatisches Museum Berlin, where from 1928 to 1951 he served as its director. Starting in 1923, he taught classes in architectural history at the Technische Universität Berlin.

Published works
Among his better known writings were Der wiedererstandene Assur, and the autobiographical Lebenserinnerungen eines Ausgräbers (Memoirs of an excavator). Other publications by Andrae include:
 Der Anu-Adad-Tempel in Assur 1909
 Die Festungswerke von Assur 1913
 Die Stelenreihen in Assur 1913
 Die archaischen Ischtar-Tempel in Assur 1922
 Farbige Keramik aus Assur und ihre Vorstufen in altassyrischen Wandmalereien 1923
 Die Kunst des Alten Orients 1925
 Kultrelief an dem Brunnen des Assurtempels zu Assur 1931
 Die Partherstadt Assur (with Heinz Lenzen) 1933
 Die ionische Säule. Bauform oder Symbol? 1933
 Alte Festraßen im Nahen Osten 1941

References

 Parts of this article are based on a translation of an article from the German Wikipedia.
 Dictionary of the Ancient Near East by Piotr Bienkowski and Alan Ralph Millard

External links
Assyrian origins: discoveries at Ashur on the Tigris: antiquities in the Vorderasiatisches Museum, Berlin, an exhibition catalog from The Metropolitan Museum of Art Libraries (fully available online as PDF), which contains material on Walter Andrae

Archaeologists from Saxony
Architects from Leipzig
1875 births
1956 deaths
German curators
Commanders Crosses of the Order of Merit of the Federal Republic of Germany
Academic staff of the Technical University of Berlin